Sadrabad (also Romanized as Şadrābād) is a village in Hakimabad Rural District, in the Central District of Zarandieh County, Markazi Province, Iran. At the 2006 census, its population was 1,302, in 352 families.

References 

Populated places in Zarandieh County